Terry Woodberry, also spelled as Terry Woodbury, (born September 9, 1963) is a former English-American football (soccer) midfielder who spent his entire career playing indoor soccer in the United States.  He was also a member of the U.S. Futsal team which took second place at the 1992 FIFA Futsal World Cup.

Player

Youth
Woodberry grew up in London, playing in the Chelsea FC youth system before moving to the United States to attend college at Southern Nazarene University.  Woodberry first attended Southern Nazarene from 1981 to 1983 and then again from 1986 to 1987.  He played two seasons of NAIA college soccer each during his two stints at the school.  In 1986, he was an NAIA honorable mention All American and in 1987, he was a third team All American.

Professional
In 1987, Woodberry signed with the Oklahoma City Warriors of the Southwest Indoor Soccer League.  He was the third leading scorer as the Warriors won the league championship.  1988, the Dallas Sidekicks of Major Indoor Soccer League drafted Woodberry in the fourth round (thirty-ninth overall).  He spent three seasons in Dallas before moving to the San Diego Sockers for the 1991-1992 season.  The Sockers won the MISL championship, the last in the league history.  The league folded following the championship series and Woodberry moved to the Wichita Wings of the National Professional Soccer League (NPSL).  For the 1993 outdoor season he was "loaned" to the Tulsa Roughnecks (USISL).  He was a first team All Star in the 1993-1994 NPSL season.  In 1994, he was with the Arizona Sandsharks of the Continental Indoor Soccer League where he earned first team All Star recognition.  In 1996, the Sandsharks temporarily withdrew from the league and Woodberry rejoined the Sidekicks, now also playing in the CISL. Woodberry was drafted in the 4th Round of the 1988 MISL Draft with the 39th overall selection by the Sidekicks.
Honor Roll. That year, he was also selected by the Kansas City Wiz in the fourteenth round (136th overall) in the 1996 MLS Inaugural Player Draft.  The Wiz waived him on March 26, 1996.  Woodberry then began the 1995-1996 NPSL season with the Wichita Wings, but played only seven games before moving to the Detroit Rockers for the remainder of the season.  In 1999, Woodberry returned to the Sidekicks which now played in the World Indoor Soccer League.  In 2001, Woodberry and his teammates won the WISL championship.

Futsal
In 1992, Woodberry was a member of the U.S. Futsal team which took second place at the FIFA Futsal World Cup.

Championship
 1991-92 San Diego Sockers Major Soccer League
 2001    Dallas Sidekicks  World Indoor Soccer League

Coach
In August 2004, he became a coach with the youth club Dallas Solar.  In 2007, he was the Region III USASA Coach of the Year.

References

External links
 Sidekicks profile
 MISL stats

1963 births
Living people
American men's futsal players
Arizona Sandsharks players
American soccer players
Continental Indoor Soccer League players
Dallas Sidekicks (original MISL) players
Detroit Rockers players
Major Indoor Soccer League (1978–1992) players
National Professional Soccer League (1984–2001) players
Oklahoma City Warriors players
San Diego Sockers (original MISL) players
Tulsa Roughnecks (1993–2000) players
Southern Nazarene University alumni
Southern Nazarene Crimson Storm men's soccer players
Wichita Wings (NPSL) players
World Indoor Soccer League players
USISL players
Association football midfielders